The Loved One is a 1965 black-and-white satirical comedy film about the funeral business in Los Angeles, based on The Loved One: An Anglo-American Tragedy (1948), a short satirical novel by Evelyn Waugh. It was directed by British filmmaker Tony Richardson, and the screenplaywhich also drew on Jessica Mitford's book The American Way of Death (1963)was written by noted American satirical novelist Terry Southern and British author Christopher Isherwood.

The film stars are: Robert Morse, Jonathan Winters, Anjanette Comer, Paul Williams and Rod Steiger. Among those making appearances in smaller roles are John Gielgud, Robert Morley, Roddy McDowall, James Coburn, Milton Berle, Dana Andrews, Tab Hunter, and Liberace.

Plot
Young Englishman Dennis Barlow wins an airline ticket and visits his uncle Sir Francis Hinsley in Los Angeles. Hinsley has worked as a production staffer at a major Hollywood studio for more than thirty years. His employer, D.J. Jr., fires him, despite the old man's faithful service. Hinsley hangs himself as a recsult.

Dennis is swayed by a prominent English expatriate to spend most of the money from his uncle's estate on a prestigious burial at Whispering Glades cemetery and mortuary. There, he meets and becomes infatuated with Aimée Thanatogenos, a hopelessly naive and idealistic cosmetician who says she was named after Aimee Semple McPherson. Chief embalmer Mr. Joyboy is attracted to her. Although she respects him professionally, Aimée has no romantic feelings for him. Somewhat overwhelmed by the services offered at Whispering Glades, Dennis is led through them by Mr. Starker, a Whispering Glades "counselor".

Aimée's idol is the Reverend Wilbur Glenworthy, owner of Whispering Glades. Aimée worships the solemn and pious reverend, but in private he is a calculating businessman who regards the cemetary as just a business venture.

To raise money, Dennis begins working at Happier Hunting Grounds, a local pet cemetery run by the reverend's twin brother Henry Glenworthy. Dennis courts Aimée with poetry, which fascinates her, though she fails to recognize the famous verses. When Aimée asks whether Dennis wrote these passages, he changes the subject. Dennis dares not to let Aimée find out where he works because she considers the pet cemetery sacrilegious.

Aimée is increasingly frustrated by Dennis' cynical and disrespectful attitude toward Whispering Glades. She is shocked at his suggestion that they marry and live on her income when she gets a promotion. Acting on advice from "Guru Brahmin," (actually a drunken newspaper staff writer), she accepts a dinner invitation from Mr. Joyboy after he secures her promotion. Thoughts of a relationship with him end quickly after she observes his bizarre and unhealthy food relationship with his morbidly obese mother.

Again, acting on advice from "Guru Brahmin," she becomes engaged to Dennis. She invites him to her home, an uncompleted house built on a cliff, now condemned and abandoned due to landslides. He cuts his visit short, alarmed by some ominous tremblings and her lack of concern over her own safety.

Dennis and Henry Glenworthy meet their neighbor, a boy genius with an interest in rocketry, and they let him set up at the pet cemetery. Mr. Joyboy brings in his pet myna bird to be buried and discovers the identity of his rival. He agrees to have the bird shot into orbit by one of the neighbor boy's rockets, instead of being buried. Mr. Joyboy brings Aimée to the ceremony. She is outraged when she sees Dennis performing the service, greatly pleasing Mr. Joyboy.

Reverend Glenworthy, seeing little profit in the cemetery once the plots are filled, decides to convert it into a retirement home, but is unable to proceed without a plan for dealing with the interred bodies. When he learns of his brother's idea of sending bodies into orbit, he sees this as a solution to his problem. He proceeds to obtain surplus rockets by hosting an orgy at Whispering Glades with top Air Force brass as guests of honor. Dennis, in a desperate attempt to reconcile with Aimée, tells her that Whispering Glades is to be shut down. She flees, but is afraid that what Dennis told her might be true.

Aimée seeks out Mr. Joyboy for comfort, but he has been called to prepare the body of an ex-astronaut nicknamed "The Condor" that will be launched into orbit. She tracks down "Guru Brahmin", but he drunkenly advises her to jump out a window. She flees to the cemetery and finds Reverend Glenworthy, who confirms Dennis' story. He tries to seduce her by promising continued employment with higher pay at his new facility. Wholly distraught, her faith in everything she once held sacred now shattered, she dies peacefully after attaching herself to an embalming machine.

Mr. Joyboy finds her body, but is afraid of a scandal, so he calls Dennis to arrange for her disposal in the pet cemetery's crematorium. Dennis agrees, but only if Mr. Joyboy gives him a first-class ticket back to England and all the cash he can lay his hands on. Dennis also imposes the condition that Aimée is placed in the casket rocket instead of the ex-astronaut (his body is also disposed of using the pet crematorium). After the televised funeral and space launch, Dennis is seen boarding the first-class section of an airliner headed to England.

Cast

 Robert Morse as Dennis Barlow
 Jonathan Winters as Henry & Wilbur Glenworthy
 Anjanette Comer as Aimée Thanatogenos
 Rod Steiger as Mr. Joyboy
 Dana Andrews as Gen. Buck Brinkman
 Milton Berle as Mr. Kenton
 James Coburn as Immigration Officer
 John Gielgud as Sir Francis Hinsley
 Tab Hunter as Whispering Glades tour guide
 Margaret Leighton as Mrs. Helen Kenton
 Liberace as Mr. Starker
 Roddy McDowall as D.J., Jr.
 Robert Morley as Sir Ambrose Abercrombie
 Barbara Nichols as Sadie Blodgett
 Lionel Stander as the Guru Brahmin
 Robert Easton as Dusty Acres
 Ayllene Gibbons as Joyboy's mother
 Paul Williams as Gunther Fry
 Alan Napier as English club official
 Bernie Kopell as Brahmin's assistant
 Joy Harmon as Miss Benson (uncredited)
 Jamie Farr as waiter at English club (uncredited)
 Roxanne Arlen as Wispering Glades hostess

Pre-production
In 1947, Evelyn Waugh visited Hollywood when Metro-Goldwyn-Mayer offered him a six-figure sum for the film rights to his novel Brideshead Revisited, despite the fact that none of the studio bosses had read the book.  When Waugh demanded complete veto rights over the finished product, the project was scrapped. During his stay in Los Angeles, Waugh became fascinated by the American obsession with the funeral industry, inspiring him to write first a lengthy journal article on the Forest Lawn cemetery and its founder Dr. Hubert Eaton and then his 1948 novel The Loved One. In the following years, numerous people attempted unsuccessfully to produce a filmed version of Waugh's novel, including the Spanish surrealist filmmaker Luis Buñuel and the comic writer/director Elaine May.

Production
The film was shot in and around the Los Angeles area with Hollywood, the Hollywood Hills, Beverly Hills, Los Angeles International Airport and Burbank among the locations. "Whispering Glades" was drawn from Forest Lawn Memorial Park in Glendale with the exterior and interior scenes shot mostly at Greystone Mansion. The condemned house scene was filmed at the house under construction at 3847 Oakfield Dr. in Sherman Oaks.

Reception
The film has a 45% positive rating at the film review aggregator website Rotten Tomatoes, derived from 20 reviews.

Rod Steiger won the Spanish Sant Jordi Award for best actor in a foreign film.

Home media
The Loved One was released on DVD June 20, 2006. It was re-released on August 20, 2013 by Warner Home Video via their Warner Archive DVD-on-demand service. The film received a Blu-ray release in May 2017.

References

External links
 
 
 
 
 

1965 films
1960s black comedy films
American black-and-white films
American black comedy films
American satirical films
Films based on British novels
Films based on works by Evelyn Waugh
Films directed by Tony Richardson
Films scored by John Addison
Films set in Los Angeles
Films shot in Los Angeles
Funeral homes in fiction
Metro-Goldwyn-Mayer films
Films with screenplays by Terry Southern
Filmways films
1965 comedy films
1965 drama films
1960s English-language films
1960s American films